The Llangollen and Corwen Railway was formed as a continuation of the Vale of Llangollen Railway to continue the line along the Dee Valley a further  to Corwen. This was opened on 1 May 1865 and was worked by the Great Western Railway and subsequently the Western Region of British Railways.

It survives today, and is operated as the heritage Llangollen Railway.

References

See also
Ruabon to Barmouth Line

Railway lines in Wales
Early Welsh railway companies
Railway lines opened in 1865